Ice Cold in Alex is a 1958 British war film set during the Western Desert campaign of World War II based on the novel of the same name by Christopher Landon. Directed by J. Lee Thompson and starring John Mills, the film was a prizewinner at the 8th Berlin International Film Festival. Under the title Desert Attack, a shortened, 79-minute version of the film was released in the United States in 1961. Film critic Craig Butler later referred to the shortened versions as nonsensical.

Plot
Captain Anson, the officer commanding a British RASC Motor Ambulance Company in Tobruk, is suffering from battle fatigue and alcoholism. With the city about to be besieged by the German Afrika Korps, Anson and most of his unit are ordered to evacuate to Alexandria. During the evacuation, Anson, MSM Tom Pugh and two nurses, Sister Diana Murdoch and Sister Denise Norton, become separated from the others in an Austin K2/Y ambulance nicknamed "Katy". The quartet decide to drive across the desert back to British lines.

As they depart, they come across an Afrikaner South African officer, Captain van der Poel, who carries a large pack, to which he seems very attached. After the South African shows Anson two bottles of gin in his backpack, van der Poel persuades Anson to let him join their drive to the safety of the British lines in Alexandria.

En route, the group meets with various obstacles, including a minefield, a broken suspension spring (during its replacement, van der Poel's great strength saves the group when he supports "Katy" on his back when the jack collapses), and the dangerous terrain of the Qattara Depression.

Twice the group encounters motorised elements of the advancing Afrika Korps; in one encounter they are fired upon, and Norton is fatally wounded. Anson blames himself and his drinking for Norton's death, and vows not to drink any alcohol until he can have an "ice cold lager in 'Alex'". Van der Poel, who claims to have learned German while working in German South West Africa, is able to talk the Germans into allowing them to go on their way. The second time however, the Germans seem reluctant, until Van der Poel shows them the contents of his backpack.

This pack becomes the focus of suspicion. Pugh, already troubled by Van der Poel's lack of knowledge of the South African Army's tea-brewing technique, follows him when he heads off into the desert with his pack and a spade (supposedly to dig a latrine). Pugh thinks he sees an antenna. Later, at night, they decide to use the ambulance headlights to see what Van de Poel is really up to. He panics, blunders into some quicksand, and submerges his pack, though not before Anson and Murdoch see that it contains a radio set. They drag him to safety. While he recovers, they realise he is probably a German spy but decide not to confront him about this. During the final leg of the journey, Katy must be hand-cranked in reverse up a sand dune escarpment, and Van der Poel's strength is again crucial to achieving this.

Continuing their drive, the party discuss their conviction that "Van der Poel" is a spy, and decide that they do not want to see him shot. When they reach Alexandria, Anson delivers everyone's papers except "Van der Poel's" to the Military Police check point and (off-screen) reports to the MP's senior officer that "Van der Poel" is a regular German soldier that they met lost in the desert and has surrendered to them under his parole (word of honour). Anson secures the MP's agreement to allow the party to enjoy a beer with their "captive" before taking him into custody as a prisoner of war.

The party then make their way to a bar and Anson orders a cold beer, which he consumes with relish. But before they have drunk their first round, a Corps of Military Police officer arrives to arrest Van der Poel. Anson orders him to wait. Having become friends with Van der Poel and indebted to him for saving the group's lives, Anson tells him that if he gives his real name, he will be treated as a prisoner of war, rather than as a spy (which would mean execution by firing squad).

Van der Poel admits to being Hauptmann Otto Lutz, an engineering officer with the 21st Panzer Division. Pugh notices that Lutz is still wearing fake South African dog tags and rips them off before the police see them. Lutz, after saying his farewells and concluding that they were "all against the desert, the greater enemy", is driven away, with a new respect for the British.

Cast 

 John Mills as Captain Anson
 Sylvia Syms as Sister Diana Murdoch
 Anthony Quayle as Captain van der Poel/Hauptmann Otto Lutz
 Harry Andrews as MSM Tom Pugh
 Diane Clare as Sister Denise Norton
 Richard Leech as Captain Crosbie
 Liam Redmond as Brigadier, Deputy Director Medical Services
 Allan Cuthbertson as the Brigadier's Staff Officer
 David Lodge as CMP Captain (tank trap)
 Michael Nightingale as CMP Captain (checkpoint)
 Basil Hoskins as CMP Lieutenant (Alexandria)
 Walter Gotell as 1st German Officer
 Frederick Jaeger as 2nd German Officer
 Richard Marner as German Guard
 Peter Arne as British Long Range Desert Group officer at oasis
 Paul Stassino as the barman

Production
The film was based on the 1957 novel Ice Cold in Alex and its serialisation (as Escape in the Desert) in the magazine Saturday Evening Post. The New York Times described the book as "an excellent escape story played out in the best Hitchcock manner."

The screenplay contains multiple key changes from the novel, including making Anson rather than Pugh the protagonist. ABPC bought the rights and assigned TJ Morison to collaborate on a treatment with Landon under the supervision of Walter Mycroft

The producers had intended to shoot the location work for Ice Cold in Alex in Egypt, but they had to switch to Libya because of the Suez conflict.

Filming began 10 September 1957.

Sylvia Syms (Sister Murdoch) said in a 2011 interview about the film that conditions during the desert shoot were so difficult it felt like they were actually in the situation the film portrays. She said: "You may find this hard to believe, but there was very little acting. It was horrible. We became those people ... we were those people". She said that today people would probably call it method acting, but added: 'We didn't know what Method Acting was, we just called it 'getting on with it'." Syms said that during the scene where the ambulance rolls backwards down the hill narrowly avoiding her, the actors assumed there would be a hawser to stop the vehicle if anything went wrong, but there was not. The actress said she was "pretty sure" Mills, Quayle and Andrews angrily upbraided director J Lee Thompson for this risky approach. She added: "He liked to push actors a bit". The quicksand sequence was filmed in an ice cold artificial bog in an English studio (some scenes were shot at Elstree) and was "very tough" on Quayle and Mills. Syms said the producers got a good deal out of her for "£30 a week", adding: "But I made a lot more when they turned it into an advert for Carlsberg". She said there are "no false heroics in it" and that she had been told by desert war veterans it is a good picture of soldiers in that theatre of war, adding: "I am proud of it".

There were a number of British films being shot in Africa around this time, including No Time to Die, Nor the Moon by Night and The Black Tent.

Music 
Although some sources claim that music was kept to a minimum, there is in fact a great deal of dramatic underscoring. Leighton Lucas wrote a stirring military march called "The Road to Alex", which was the main theme, and a "Romance".

Reception

Box Office
The film was one of the twelve most popular movies at the British box office in 1958 (that list included several other war related movies - The Bridge on the River Kwai, The Camp on Blood Island, Dunkirk, The Key, Carve Her Name with Pride, The Wind Cannot Read - as well as Carry On Sergeant, A Cry from the Streets, Happy Is the Bride and Indiscreet.) Kinematograph Weekly listed it as being "in the money" at the British box office in 1958.

Awards
The film was nominated for several awards:
 Winner FIPRESCI Award at the Berlin International Film Festival
 Nominated BAFTA Award for Best Film
 Nominated BAFTA Award for Best British Film
 Nominated BAFTA Award for Best Actor in a Leading Role (Anthony Quayle)
 Nominated BAFTA Award for Best British Screenplay (T. J. Morrison)
 Nominated Golden Bear Berlin International Film Festival

Legacy
The film is arguably the best known credit for Sylvia Syms.

Home media
A Region B/2 Blu-ray restoration of Ice Cold in Alex was released in the United Kingdom on 18 February 2018. A restored region B/2 version was previously released on 11 September 2011. In March 2020, the film was released on Blu Ray in region A/1 (North America) by Film Movement Classics in a five-film set called Their Finest Hour 5 British War Classics.

Lager advertisement
The final scene, in which Mills' character finally gets his glass of lager, was used in the 1980s in beer advertisements on television. The scene was reportedly filmed some weeks after the rest of the film, at Elstree. Real lager had to be used to "look right", and Mills had to drink numerous glasses full until the shots were finished, and was "a little 'heady'" by the end.

Sylvia Syms has said that the Danish beer Carlsberg was chosen because they could never have been seen to be drinking a German lager, since the United Kingdom and Germany are at war during the film. The beer referred to in the original novel is Rheingold, which, despite its German name, is American.

Scenes from the film were used in a late-1980s television advertising campaign for the German Holsten Pils lager. Each advertisement mixed original footage from a different film (another example was The Great Escape, 1963) with new humorous material starring British comedian Griff Rhys Jones and finishing with the slogan: "A Holsten Pils Production". In retaliation, rival Carlsberg simply lifted the segment in which Mills contemplates the freshly poured lager in the clearly Carlsberg-branded glass, before downing it in one go and declaring, "Worth waiting for!" This was followed by a variation in the usual Carlsberg tagline: "Still  probably the best lager in the world."

Notes

References

Further reading
 3 of 4 stars.
 3 of 5 stars.

External links 
 
Ice Cold in Alex at BFI Screenonline
Review of film at Variety
Ice Cold in Alex: the shoot in pictures behind the scenes photo collection

1958 films
1958 war films
British black-and-white films
British war films
British World War II films
Films directed by J. Lee Thompson
Films based on British novels
North African campaign films
Films set in 1942
Films set in Libya
Films set in Alexandria
Films set in deserts
Films shot at Associated British Studios
20th Century Fox films
Associated British Picture Corporation
1950s English-language films
1950s British films